Early Germanic Literature and Culture is a book edited by Brian O. Murdoch and Malcolm Read. The book was published by Camden House in 2004. It covers anthropological, archaeological and philological aspects of the study on early Germanic culture and literature. The chapters of the book are written by individual specialists in these fields.

See also 

 Language and history in the early Germanic world
 The Early Germans

Sources

External links
 Publisher's website

2004 non-fiction books
Germanic studies